Charles Draper (23 October 1869 – 21 October 1952) was a British classical clarinetist, sometimes described as the grandfather of English clarinetists.

Early life and education 
Draper was born in Odcombe, Somerset. His father and brother, having been cellists and clarinetists, respectively. In 1888, he studied with Henry Lazarus and he won a scholarship to the Royal College of Music, where he continued as a student of Lazarus until the latter's retirement. He also studied for a year under Julian Egerton.

Career 
Draper premiered Stanford's Clarinet Concerto in 1903 with the Bournemouth Municipal Orchestra. Stanford's Clarinet Sonata was also dedicated to Draper. Draper was also a notable teacher, teaching at the Royal College of Music, Trinity College of Music, and Guildhall School of Music and Drama, and counting Frederick Thurston among his students.

Personal life 
Draper's son, Paul Beaumont Draper, was also an accomplished bassoonist. Draper died in Surbiton, aged 82.

References

 Weston, Pamela (1971), Clarinet Virtuosi of the Past, 292 pages.

External links
Music.ed.ac.uk

1869 births
1952 deaths
British classical clarinetists
Alumni of the Royal College of Music
Academics of the Royal College of Music